Edward "Doc" Joseph Edelen Jr. (March 16, 1912 – February 1, 1982) was an American professional baseball player who played in two games for the Washington Senators during the  season.  He pitched a total of one inning over the two games giving up three runs.  Edelen worked as a general practice doctor from 1938 to 1982. He was born in Bryantown, Maryland, and died in La Plata, Maryland, at the age of 69.

References

External links

Major League Baseball pitchers
Baseball players from Maryland
Washington Senators (1901–1960) players
Mount St. Mary's Mountaineers baseball players
1912 births
1982 deaths
People from Bryantown, Maryland